The Smile Has Left Your Eyes is a 2018 South Korean television series starring Seo In-guk, Jung So-min and Park Sung-woong. It is a remake of the 2002 Japanese television series Sora Kara Furu Ichioku no Hoshi. It aired on tvN on October 3, 2018 on Wednesday and Thursday at 21:30 KST time slot.

Synopsis
This 2018 Korean drama revolves around Kim Moo Young (Seo In-guk) - a complex, mysterious man with a forgotten past. He meets and falls in love with Yoo Jin-Kang (Jung So-min), and although her initial impression of him is pretty negative, later she discovers that Moo young is innocent and struggling to recognize about his past life. However, her older brother, Yoo Jin Gook (Park Sung-woong), a homicide detective, suspects that Moo-Young is more sinister than he lets on, oblivious to the fact that he is the key to both Moo-young and Jin-Kang's intertwined history. The situation becomes more complicated when Moo young regains his memories which leads him to find the truth about his father's death and more.

Cast

Main
Seo In-guk as Kim Moo-young
An assistant in a craft microbrewery. He is indifferent on the surface, yet has a childlike innocence in him.
Jung So-min as Yoo Jin-kang
An advertisement designer who lost her parents in an accident when she was young, and underwent diverse growing pains.
Park Sung-woong as Yoo Jin-gook
Yoo Jin-kang's brother who has been a homicide detective for 27 years.

Supporting

People around Kim Moo-young 
Go Min-si as Im Yoo-ri
 A girl whose suicide was prevented by Moo-young
Yoo Jae-myung as Yang Kyung-mo
 A psychiatrist
Kim Ji-hyun as Jang Se-ran

People around Yoo Jin-kang 

Seo Eun-soo as Baek Seung-ah
A daughter of a rich family involved in the distribution industry.

Do Sang-woo as Jang Woo-sung
Baek Seung-ah's boyfriend.

People around Yoo Jin-gook 

Jang Young-nam as Tak So-jung
Kwon Soo-hyun as Eom Cho-rong

People of Arts Brewery 

Lee Hong-bin as No Hee-joon
Min Woo-hyuk as CEO Jung Sang-yoon
?? as Brew Master / Kil Hyung-joo

Won Young Police Station 

Choi Byung-mo as Lee Kyung-cheol
Kim Seo-kyung as Hwang Gun
?? as Jo Ki-joo
Han Sa-myung as Lee Jae-mi

People of Design lux 

Park Min-jung as CEO Hwang
Lee Ji-min as Assistant Manager Im

Others 

Lee Ji-ha as Nun Lucy
Han Da-sol as Shin Yoo-jin

Production
In April 2017, it was reported that tvN will be including a Korean remake of Sora Kara Furu Ichioku no Hoshi as part of its drama lineup for the second half of 2017. In May 2017, tvN confirmed the production of the remake, which will be directed by Yoo Je-won.

Seo and Jung were announced as the leads in June 2018, and Park's casting was confirmed in July 2018.

The first script reading took place in early July 2018 at Sangam DDMC, Sangam-dong, Seoul.

The series was originally scheduled to premiere on September 26, 2018 but was delayed by a week.

Original soundtrack

Part 1

Part 2

Part 3

Part 4

Viewership

References

External links
  
 
 

Korean-language television shows
TVN (South Korean TV channel) television dramas
2018 South Korean television series debuts
2018 South Korean television series endings
South Korean mystery television series
South Korean thriller television series
South Korean television series based on Japanese television series
Television series by Studio Dragon